Salta Cathedral (Catedral de Salta) is a Roman Catholic cathedral in Salta, Argentina. The church serves as the seat and the metropolitan cathedral of the Archbishop of Salta. The cathedral is dedicated to Jesus Christ as the “Lord of Miracles” and the Blessed Virgin Mary as the “Our Lady of the Miraculous Rosary”. 

Pope Leo XIII granted a decree of Pontifical coronation for both of its enshrined images on 23 July 1899 via the Bishop Ordinary of Salta, Monsignor Matías Linares y Sanzetenea. The same bishop executed the rite of public coronation in 13 September 1902.  

The shrine was inaugurated to the public on 20 October 1918 and finally declared a national monument No. #95687 by the Government of Argentina on 14 June 1941.

History 

It was necessary to build a new cathedral in 1856, after an earthquake destroyed the old building. Services began in 1858 under the patronage of Archbishop José Eusebio Colombres. Felipe Bertrés was the architect. The project was completed in 1882.

Photogallery

Notes

Sources

 Website of the Archdiocese of Salta Cathedral 

Roman Catholic cathedrals in Argentina
19th-century Roman Catholic church buildings in Argentina
Buildings and structures in Salta Province
Baroque church buildings in Argentina
Roman Catholic churches completed in 1882
National Historic Monuments of Argentina
Basilica churches in Argentina